is a Japanese politician who served as Minister of Economy, Trade and Industry from October 2019 to October 2021. He is a member of the House of Representative since 2000, representing the Ibaraki 4th District.

Early life 
Kajiyama was born in Hitachiōta, Ibaraki. His father, Seiroku Kajiyama, was a prefectural assemblyman who later won a seat in the House of Representatives and rose to the positions of LDP Secretary-General and several Cabinet posts. Kajiyama graduated from Nihon University and joined the Power Reactor and Nuclear Fuel Development Corporation in 1979, where he worked until 1985. After a stint as his father's secretary from 1985 to 1988, he started a non-ferrous metals trading company and served as its president.

Political career 
After his father's death in 2000, Kajiyama successfully ran to take over his father's seat in the 2000 general election. He thereafter won re-election six times.

In 2006, he was appointed as Parliamentary Vice-Minister of Land, Infrastructure, Transport and Tourism Administration.

Kajiyama was appointed to serve as State Minister of Land, Infrastructure, Transport and Tourism in 2012.

In August 2017, he was appointed to serve as minister in charge of administrative reforms, and announced new guidelines on the management of administrative documents. This came in the wake of the Moritomo Gakuen scandal, in which the government was accused of destroying records to cover up a favorable land-sale contract.

In October 2019, he was appointed to serve as Minister of Economy, Trade and Industry, Minister in charge of Industrial Competitiveness, Minister in charge of International Exposition, Minister for Economic Cooperation with Russia, Minister in charge of the Response to the Economic Impact caused by the Nuclear Accident, and Minister of State for the Nuclear Damage Compensation and Decommissioning Facilitation Corporation. As METI minister, he announced initiatives to phase out coal power in Japan in favor of renewable energy.

References

External links 

  in Japanese

Members of the House of Representatives (Japan)
Nihon University alumni
Politicians from Ibaraki Prefecture
Living people
1955 births
Liberal Democratic Party (Japan) politicians
21st-century Japanese politicians
Government ministers of Japan